"Imagine" is a song by actor/singer-songwriter Ben Platt. It was written by Platt, with additional writing from Michael Pollack, Eskeerdo, Stefan Johnson, Jon Bellion and The Monsters & Strangerz, the latter two of whom also served as music producers for the song. It was released as the lead single from his upcoming second studio album, Reverie, on April 23, 2021, followed by a remixed version by Tiësto on May 28, 2021.

Background
According to Platt, the song was written in 2020 while he was stuck in quarantine during the COVID-19 pandemic and during the writing process for his second solo album. He described that for both the song and its accompanying music video, he was inspired by "the way that our loved ones, the people that make life worth living, can turn the mundanity of suburbia into something magical and fantastical. Everyone has that person or people that make their world technicolor, fueling us with a love that can feel supernatural." He also stated that the song's lyrics are clearly related to his relationship with boyfriend Noah Galvin.

Release and promotion
Prior to the single's release, Platt teased the chorus of the song on TikTok. The complete song was made available for pre-sale on April 20, 2021, and was released on April 23, 2021. Dutch electronic producer Tiësto released a remix of the song on May 28, 2021. An acoustic version was released on June 11, 2021.

Music video
A music video for the song, directed by Matty Peacock, was released the same day as the song, which features Platt jumping on cars and levitating in mid-air in a suburban neighborhood setting.

Live performances
Platt's first live performance of the song took place on the May 13, 2021 episode of The Late Late Show with James Corden. He also performed it on The Kelly Clarkson Show on June 8, 2021, as well as on the Season 20 finale of NBC's The Voice on May 25, 2021, where he also introduced a trailer for the upcoming 2021 film adaptation of Dear Evan Hansen, in which he reprises his performance in the titular role.

Charts

Release history

References

2021 songs
2021 singles
Ben Platt songs
Songs written by Ben Platt
Songs written by Michael Pollack (musician)
Songs written by Jon Bellion
Songs written by Eskeerdo
Songs written by Stefan Johnson
Song recordings produced by the Monsters & Strangerz
LGBT-related songs